The 1864 United States elections were held on November 8, 1864. National Union President Abraham Lincoln was elected to a second term, while the Republicans added to their majorities in Congress. The elections were held during the American Civil War. Lincoln would be assassinated shortly into his second term.

In the Presidential election, National Union Party nominee President Abraham Lincoln defeated Democratic nominee former General George B. McClellan. Despite factionalism in the Republican Party and earlier concern about the progress of the war, Lincoln easily carried the popular vote and won the greatest share of the electoral vote since James Monroe won re-election unopposed in 1820. Lincoln's win made him the first president to win re-election since Andrew Jackson, and the first two-term President unaffiliated with the Democratic-Republican Party or the Democratic Party since John Adams. Lincoln formed a bipartisan electoral alliance with War Democrats by selecting Democrat Andrew Johnson as his running mate and campaigning on the National Union ticket, making this the first and to date only election in which a winning ticket was composed of members of two separate parties.

Republicans gained seats in the House of Representatives, making their plurality into a majority.

In the Senate, Republicans gained several seats, and continued to hold a majority.

See also
1864 United States presidential election
1864–65 United States House of Representatives elections
1864–65 United States Senate elections

References

1864 elections in the United States
1864